Citizen Sleeper is a 2022 role-playing video game by Jump Over the Age and published by Fellow Traveller for macOS, Microsoft Windows, Nintendo Switch, Xbox One, and Xbox Series X/S on . It is also set to release for PlayStation 4 and PlayStation 5 on 31 March 2023.

Gameplay 
In order to progress the plot, survive, and escape the Eye, the player rolls a number of dice each in-game day. These dice are then placed into different tasks, where higher numbers generally indicate better outcomes. Lower numbers generally are useful on the data-cloud side of the station, which allow the player to gather intelligence on the activities of the various factions. Higher numbers generally lead to better outcomes throughout the rest of the game. The player must constantly work in order to feed themselves and care for their degrading robot body which requires specialized materials to upkeep.

Plot 
In Citizen Sleeper, the player character is a "Sleeper," a human whose mind has been digitized and has been put into a robot body to be controlled by the Essen-Arp corporation. The player's Sleeper has escaped indentured servitude on a freighter and has arrived at a space station called the Eye, where they fight for both survival and freedom. The player meets a number of different people who represent different factions and interests. The game features multiple endings depending on the choice of the player.

Development 
Citizen Sleeper was created and developed by Gareth Damian Martin, through their London-based  one-person game development studio Jump Over The Age. Character artwork was designed by Guillaume Singelin. When Martin first began their work as a developer, they conceived of two games: In Other Waters and a game about being a thief in a fantasy city trying to survive hardships and poverty while getting involved in the political situation there. The latter changed to a sci-fi setting and became the basis for Citizen Sleeper.

During development, Martin focused on the intimate feeling of people coming together, and their own experiences as a non-binary person struggling to make ends meet in a city through the gig economy. When playing science-fiction games like the Mass Effect series, Martin found themselves drawn to the side characters. "As science fiction stories drag the narrative toward explosive quests, I want to stay with these people living ordinary lives in extraordinary settings." They cited Diaries of a Spaceport Janitor as an example of the kind of story they were aiming towards, which showed how science-fiction could be a great space for slice of life gaming experiences.

Contemporary experiences of Uber and other gig economy and debt experiences drove the direction of how Martin portrayed capitalism in the game. Martin said, "I wanted to tell a story at capitalism’s periphery, where so many of us have learned how to exist." They also focused on how life can be incredibly precarious for people living at the periphery of capitalism, and they were inspired by Anna Tsing's The Mushroom at the End of the World among other works.

Reception 
Citizen Sleeper received "generally favorable" reviews, according to review aggregator Metacritic. At its release, Polygon named Citizen Sleeper among the best games of 2022. 

Reviewers praised Citizen Sleepers writing, with a number of reviewers remarking on the well-drawn characters found in the game. The Guardians Lewis Packwood called the writing "gloriously evocative and compelling" and noted that the picture that is painted in the game feels "intriguing and unique." Polygons Alexis Ong called the game's ability to remove the player from chasing concrete objectives as part of the plot its "greatest strength.". IndieGameReviewer wrote "The dual layer of a virtual ghost world and an unfathomable wet one create a simply sublime and rare experience," giving it 3rd position on its top 10 games of 2022.

Critics praised the game's streamlined mechanics. Eurogamers Chris Tapsell described the game's mechanics as creating a "wonderful elegance" in a positive review.

Accolades

References

Further reading

External links 
 

2022 video games
Cyberpunk video games
Indie video games
MacOS games
Nintendo Switch games
Role-playing video games
Single-player video games
Video games developed in the United Kingdom
Windows games
Xbox Series X and Series S games
Fellow Traveller games